{{DISPLAYTITLE:C6H8S}}
The molecular formula C6H8S (molar mass: 112.19 g/mol, exact mass: 112.0347 u) may refer to:

 2,3-Dihydrothiepine
 2,7-Dihydrothiepine
 2,5-Dimethylthiophene

Molecular formulas